Leskiini is a tribe of flies in the family Tachinidae.

Genera 
Aphria Robineau-Desvoidy, 1830
Bithia Robineau-Desvoidy, 1863
Demoticus Macquart, 1854
Leskia Robineau-Desvoidy, 1830
Solieria Robineau-Desvoidy, 1848

References 

Diptera of Europe
Tachininae
Brachycera tribes